Robert W. Newmann (born 1944) is an American painter and sculptor. He was a member of the Washington Color School art movement. In his early career he painted canvas and transitioned in his late career to working in sculpture and installation art.

Biography  
Robert W. Newmann was born in 1944 in Nyack, New York. He attended Rochester Institute of Technology, the University of Iowa, and the Corcoran College of Art and Design.

In 1984, he was part of a New York lawsuit, Newmann vs. Delmar Realty Co. over the completion of a New York City mural sandblasted on the side of a brick wall. The lawsuit was notable for establishing artists legal rights in the case of defaced public artwork.

Newmann's work is included in the public museum collection at the Smithsonian American Art Museum.

References 

1944 births
Living people
Artists from New York City
People from Nyack, New York